Lytras is a surname. Notable people with the surname include:

 Nikiforos Lytras (1832–1904), Greek painter
 Nikolaos Lytras (1883–1927), Greek painter 
 Orfeas Lytras (born 1998), Greek footballer 

Greek-language surnames